Storthodontus is a genus of beetles in the family Carabidae, containing the following species:

 Storthodontus aegeon Chaudoir, 1862
 Storthodontus ambreanus Boileau, 1902
 Storthodontus boileaui Alluaud, 1930
 Storthodontus bresseti Boileau, 1902
 Storthodontus diastictus Alluaud, 1930
 Storthodontus elegans Jeannel, 1946
 Storthodontus impressifrons (Fairmaire, 1898)
 Storthodontus mathiauxi Jeannel, 1946
 Storthodontus nimrod Chaudoir, 1855
 Storthodontus peyrierasi Basilewsky, 1973
 Storthodontus reticulatus Basilewsky, 1957

References

Scaritinae